Stad is the word for city used in Swedish, Danish,  Dutch, Afrikaans, Norwegian and Luxembourgish, and related to German Stadt.

Places
 Stad (peninsula) or Stadlandet, the westernmost point in mainland Norway
 Stad, Norway, a municipality in Vestland county, Norway (established 1 Jan 2020)
 Stad Ship Tunnel, a proposed ship tunnel through the Stad peninsula in Norway
 Kaapstad, the city of Cape Town in Afrikaans

Other
 The Irish language word meaning "stop"
 Science Teams Against Disease is a fund which aims to develop new treatments for schizophrenia
 Student team achievement division, a cooperative learning classroom technique

See also
 An Stad, a former guest house in Dublin, Ireland
 Stad (Sweden), a former city designation in Sweden